Thomas Bunbury may refer to:
Sir Thomas Bunbury, 1st Baronet (died 1682) of the Bunbury baronets
Sir Charles Bunbury, 6th Baronet (Thomas Charles Bunbury, 1740–1821), British politician
Thomas Bunbury (British Army general) (1783–1857), British soldier and colonialist
Thomas Bunbury (British Army officer, born 1791) (1791–1861), service included Peninsular War, Australia, New Zealand and India
Thomas Bunbury (bishop) (1830–1907), Irish clergyman
Thomas Bunbury (MP) (1774–1846), Irish Conservative politician

See also
Bunbury (disambiguation)